Ordushahi (also Romanized as Ordūshāhī; also known as Emām Kandī and Ordoshāhī) is a village in Torkaman Rural District, in the Central District of Urmia County, West Azerbaijan Province, Iran. At the 2006 census, its population was 451, in 111 families.

References 

Populated places in Urmia County